Coronach  is a community in southern Saskatchewan, Canada near the Canada–US border. It was founded in 1926 by the Canadian Pacific Railway and named after Coronach, the horse who had just won The Derby in England that year. Coronach was officially incorporated in 1928.

History
After its incorporation in 1928, the town's population teetered around 300, until about 1974 when the town discovered that they were to receive the Poplar River Power Project.  This project brought many new citizens to the town to help with the building and operation of the Power Plant.  The Poplar River Power Plant can be seen from a distance with the large smoke stack extending above the town.  With the Poplar River Power Project also came the development of the Coronach Coal Mine, which provides the coal/fuel to the Power Plant.  The Coal mine has had a few locations and a variety of owners; it is currently owned by Westmoreland Coal Company.

Demographics 

According to the 2016 Census, Coronach had a median age of 43.0 years.

Climate

Services and attractions 
Big Muddy & Outlaw Cave Tours
 Camping – Poolside Park Campground, Poplar River Community Park, East Side Campground  
 Coronach Sportsplex (which includes a regulation-size artificial ice rink, four artificial ice sheets for curling, and a heated outdoor swimming pool for the summer months)
 Four baseball diamonds
 Coronach Golf Club with a 9-hole, 3,000 yard grass greens course
 Coronach Museum – was established in 1987 to tell the story of the founding, settlement and development of the Coronach district from the year 1900. There is a hospital room, a schoolroom, communication room, shop, parlour, library, town office, bedroom, store, kitchen, toy room, church, sewing and textiles, and bathroom to display artifacts that shaped the history

Transportation 
The Town of Coronach is a part owner of the Fife Lake Railway.

See also 
List of towns in Saskatchewan
List of communities in Saskatchewan

References 

Towns in Saskatchewan
Division No. 3, Saskatchewan
Hart Butte No. 11, Saskatchewan